Bailey Island may refer to:

 Bailey Island (Maine)
 Bailey Island (South Carolina)